General Sir Geoffrey Hugh Whitby Howlett,  (5 February 1930 – 21 April 2022) was a senior British Army officer who was Commander-in-Chief of Allied Forces Northern Europe.

Military career
Educated at Wellington College and at the Royal Military College, Sandhurst, Howlett was commissioned into the Queen's Own Royal West Kent Regiment in 1950. He was awarded the Military Cross in 1952.

In 1971 Howlett was appointed Commanding Officer of 2nd Battalion, The Parachute Regiment and in 1975 he was made Commander of 16th Parachute Brigade. He was General Officer Commanding 1st Armoured Division from 1979 and Commandant of the Royal Military Academy Sandhurst from 1982 to 1983 when he became GOC South East District. He was made Commander-in-Chief of Allied Forces Northern Europe in 1986; he retired in 1989.

Howlett was Colonel Commandant of the Parachute Regiment from 1983 to 1990.

He died on 21 April 2022, at the age of 92.

References

|-

|-
 

|-

1930 births
2022 deaths
British Army generals
British Army personnel of the Malayan Emergency
British military personnel of the Cyprus Emergency
British military personnel of the Suez Crisis
British military personnel of The Troubles (Northern Ireland)
British Parachute Regiment officers
Commandants of Sandhurst
Free Foresters cricketers
Graduates of the Royal Military Academy Sandhurst
Knights Commander of the Order of the British Empire
People educated at Wellington College, Berkshire
Queen's Own Royal West Kent Regiment officers
Recipients of the Military Cross